Legi may refer to:
Legi, a day in the Pasaran cycle of the Javanese calendar
Łęgi (disambiguation), the name of several places in Poland
N,N'-diacetyllegionaminate synthase, an enzyme
Giacomo Legi, a Baroque painter of Flemish descent who was active principally in Italy during the first half of the 17th century.